Turkay Sabit Şeren (15 May 1932 – 7 July 2016) was a Turkish football player, who was a one-time goalkeeper of Galatasaray. He played for Galatasaray between 1947 and 1966 and was capped 52 times for Turkey, including two matches at the 1954 FIFA World Cup. His heroic saves against West Germany in 1951 in Berlin was what he is still remembered for. Turkey had won 2–1. Because of that unforgettable day, he is nicknamed as "Berlin Panteri" (Panther of Berlin). He also coached Galatasaray. Şeren was awarded a testimonial match by the club in 1967 in Istanbul, inviting players like Ion Pârcălab, Lev Yashin and Ion Nunweiller.

After his retirement, Şeren became a football columnist and a television commentator.

Şeren died at age 84 on 7 July 2016. He was interred at Zincirlikuyu Cemetery following a memorial service held at the Türk Telekom Arena and the religious funeral service at Teşvikiye Mosque on 9 July 2016. He was survived by his son Emre Şeren

Career statistics

Club

Honours

As player

Galatasaray
Süper Lig: 1961–62, 1962–63
Turkish Cup: 1962–63, 1963–64, 1964–65, 1965–66
Turkish Super Cup: 1966
Istanbul Football League: 1948–49, 1954–55, 1955–56, 1957–58
TSYD Cup: 1963, 1966

Records
Most appearances for Galatasaray SK (631)
Most appearances at Kıtalar Arası Derbi (54)
Most total seasons as Galatasaray SK 1st Goalkeeper (15)

See also
List of one-club men
List of Galatasaray S.K. records and statistics

References

1932 births
Sportspeople from Ankara
Galatasaray High School alumni
Association football goalkeepers
Turkish footballers
Turkish football managers
Galatasaray S.K. footballers
Galatasaray S.K. (football) managers
1954 FIFA World Cup players
Turkey international footballers
Süper Lig players
Süper Lig managers
Mersin İdman Yurdu managers
Vefa S.K. managers
Samsunspor managers
2016 deaths
Burials at Zincirlikuyu Cemetery